Macedonian Revolution may refer to: 
1854 Greek Macedonian rebellion
1867 Greek Macedonian rebellion
1876 Bulgarian Macedonian rebellion
1878 Macedonian Serb rebellion
1878 Greek Macedonian rebellion
1879 Bulgarian Macedonian rebellion
1880 Macedonian Serb rebellion
1896–1897 Greek Macedonian rebellion
1903 Bulgarian Macedonian rebellion
Macedonian Struggle
World War II in Yugoslav Macedonia

History of Macedonia (region)